"Devoted to You" is a song written by Felice and Boudleaux Bryant.

The best-known recording was by The Everly Brothers, released by Cadence Records as catalog number 1350. This version was issued as the flip side of "Bird Dog," but reached the charts on its own, at No. 10 on the United States pop charts, No. 25 in Australia, and No. 1 in Canada. In addition, the song reached No. 7 on the United States country music chart and No. 2 on the rhythm and blues chart.

Charts

Carly Simon and James Taylor version

The song was also recorded by American singer-songwriters Carly Simon and James Taylor, appearing on Simon's 1978 album, Boys in the Trees. Following the smash success of the album's first single "You Belong to Me", Devoted to You was released as the second single, and it also became a Top 40 hit. Charting on both the Billboard Pop singles chart and Billboard Adult Contemporary chart, as well as the Hot Country Songs chart. The song also charted in Canada, peaking at No. 50.

Record World said that "The vocal harmonies blend perfectly and [Arif] Mardin's sparse production is, once again, flawless."

Personnel
Carly Simon - lead vocals
James Taylor - lead vocals, acoustic guitar
Richard Tee - Fender Rhodes electric piano
Hugh McCracken - electric guitar solo
Will Lee - bass
Steve Gadd - drums

Track listing
7" single 
 "Devoted to You" – 2:29
 "Boys in the Trees" – 3:13

Charts

Cover versions

The Beach Boys' rendition was a part of their 1965 album Beach Boys' Party!, sung by Mike Love and Brian Wilson. This version was later included as the B-side to the Mike Love and Brian Wilson single,  "Gettin' Hungry". A recording without the Party! sound effects can be found on their Hawthorne, CA compilation.

Brian Hyland covered the song for his 1964 album Here's to Our Love. Sandy Posey recorded a compelling cover on her Sweet Dreams album, in which she emulated the Everly Brothers' harmony using multi-track recording. The song was also covered by The Seekers on their 1993 live album 25 Year Reunion Celebration, and by Linda Ronstadt and Valerie Carter on Ronstadt's 1996 album Dedicated to the One I Love.

References

1958 songs
Songs written by Felice and Boudleaux Bryant
The Everly Brothers songs
The Beach Boys songs
Carly Simon songs
James Taylor songs